Boston & Albany Railroad Station may refer to:

Boston & Albany Railroad Station (Framingham)
 Boston & Albany Railroad Station (Newton)
Boston & Albany Railroad Station (Wellesley Hills)